Deepak Sareen is a Bollywood film director and assistant director. His first film as director was Ranbhoomi and last film as director was Albela.

As assistant director
Deewaar (1975)
Kabhi Kabhi (1976)
Doosra Aadmi (1977)
Silsila (1981)
Mashaal (1984)
Faasle (1985)

As director
Ranbhoomi (1991)
Aaina (1993)
Gaddaar (1995)
Jab Pyaar Kisise Hota Hai (1998)
Albela (2001)

External links

Indian male film actors
Living people
Year of birth missing (living people)